Shirley Tolentino (1943–2010) was the first black woman to serve on the New Jersey Superior Court and was the first black woman appointed to the Jersey City Municipal Court and to serve as its presiding judge. She served as president of National Association of Women Judges.

Background
Born and raised in Jersey City, Tolentino graduated Henry Snyder High School. She earned a bachelor's degree in Latin from the College of St. Elizabeth (CSE) in 1965. She taught high school Latin and English before earning her J.D. degree from Seton Hall University School of Law in 1971. She received a master of laws degree in criminal justice from New York University School of Law in 1980.

Career
Shirley Tolentino was the first black woman to serve on the Superior Court and was the first black woman appointed to the Jersey City Municipal Court and to serve as its presiding judge.

Tolentino worked as a legal editor for Prentice-Hall from 1971 to 1972 and as an adjudicator for the Veterans Administration from 1972 to 1973. She as a deputy attorney general from 1973 until 1976. In 1976, then-Mayor of Jersey City Paul T. Jordan appointed Tolentino as the first African-American woman to serve as a full-time municipal court judge in New Jersey. She was elevated to presiding judge in 1981.

Governor of New Jersey Thomas Kean nominated Tolentino to the Superior Court in January 1984. She sat in the civil, criminal and family divisions during a 26-year period.

Judge Tolentino served on the Supreme Court Task Force on Minorities and was a member of the National Association of Women Judges, serving as president in 1996-97

Awards and honors
Tolentino received an honorary degree from CSE in 1980. In 1981, she received the Whitney Young Award from the Hudson County Urban League.

The intersection where the Hudson County Courthouse is situated was named in her honor in March 2012.

In 2014, a new postal facility at the HUB on MLK Drive in Jersey was designated the Shirley A. Tolentino Post Office Building in her honor.

See also 
 List of African-American jurists
 List of first women lawyers and judges in New Jersey

References 

1943 births
2010 deaths
Henry Snyder High School alumni
New Jersey state court judges
People from Jersey City, New Jersey
New York University School of Law alumni
Seton Hall University School of Law alumni
African-American judges
Women in New Jersey politics
Superior court judges in the United States
20th-century American judges
20th-century American women judges
20th-century African-American women
20th-century African-American people
21st-century African-American people
21st-century African-American women